Walter Edward Block (born August 21, 1941) is an American Austrian School economist and anarcho-capitalist theorist. He currently holds the Harold E. Wirth Eminent Scholar Endowed Chair in Economics at the School of Business at Loyola University New Orleans, and is a senior fellow of the non-profit think-tank Ludwig von Mises Institute in Auburn, Alabama. He is best known for his 1976 book Defending the Undefendable, which takes contrarian positions in defending acts which are illegal or disreputable but Block argues are actually victimless crimes or benefit the public.

Personal life
Walter Block was born in Brooklyn, New York to Jewish parents Abraham Block, a certified public accountant, and Ruth Block, a paralegal, both of whom Block has said were liberals. He attended James Madison High School, where Bernie Sanders was on his track team. Block earned his Ph.D. degree in economics from Columbia University and wrote his dissertation on rent control in the United States under Gary Becker. Block identifies himself as a "devout atheist".

In an interview,  Block stated, "In the fifties and sixties, I was just another commie living in Brooklyn." Block credits his shift to libertarianism to his having attended a lecture by Ayn Rand while he was an undergraduate student. Block later attended a luncheon with Rand, Nathaniel Branden, and Leonard Peikoff at which Branden suggested that Block read Atlas Shrugged by Ayn Rand and Economics in One Lesson by Henry Hazlitt. He says that the final push to his conversion came from having met Austrian School and anarcho-capitalist theorist Murray Rothbard. While Block is an anarcho-capitalist and, unlike the Objectivist followers of Ayn Rand, ultimately opposed to limited or minimal government; and even while criticizing her movement as "cultish", Block still describes himself as "a big fan" of Rand and considers Atlas Shrugged to be "the best novel ever written."

Professional career

Walter Block received a B.A. in philosophy from Brooklyn College in 1964 and a Ph.D. in economics from Columbia University in 1972. He taught at the University of Central Arkansas, Holy Cross College, Baruch College and Rutgers University. He now holds the Harold E. Wirth Eminent Scholar Endowed Chair in Economics at the Butt College of Business, Loyola University, in New Orleans.

From 1979 to 1991, Block was the senior economist with the Fraser Institute. He is currently a senior fellow at the think-tank Ludwig von Mises Institute, which has published various blog posts of his since 2000.

In the years since 1971, his work has been published in the Journal of Libertarian Studies, the Quarterly Journal of Austrian Economics, the Review of Austrian Economics, the American Journal of Economics and Sociology, the Journal of Labor Economics and Public Choice and in Psychology Today and other popular media. In 2017, he hit the milestone of publishing over 500 peer-reviewed articles.

Defending the Undefendable

Walter Block has written two dozen books.  He is best known for his 1976 book Defending the Undefendable. The book has been translated into ten foreign languages. Fox Business Channel pundit John Stossel wrote that Block's "eye-opening" book inspired him to see that economics "illuminates what common sense overlooks."

Viewpoints

Slavery and segregation

"Voluntary slave contract"

Block believes that people should have the legal right to sell themselves into slavery, or to buy and keep slaves who have sold themselves into slavery, in a libertarian legal order.

In an essay on "inalienability" of natural and legal rights, Block defends what he calls a "voluntary slave contract", arguing that it is "a bona fide contract where consideration crosses hands; when it is abrogated, theft occurs". He notes only Robert Nozick agrees with him, and critiques the views of the libertarians who disagree.  Block seeks to make "a tiny adjustment" which "strengthens libertarianism by making it more internally consistent." He argues that his position shows "that contract, predicated on private property [can] reach to the furthest realms of human interaction, even to voluntary slave contracts."

Slavery and civil rights in the United States
A January 2014 article in the New York Times stated that Block "suggested in an interview that the daily life of the enslaved was 'not so bad – you pick cotton and sing songs.'" The piece also reported that Block said Woolworth's had the right to exclude black people from its lunch counters, asserting that "no one is compelled to associate with people against their will." Block responded to the article by accusing the Times of libel for taking quotes out of context and claiming the latter quote was not accurate.  In his response he called slavery "depraved and monstrous," arguing that it is not the nature of the work slaves perform that makes slavery monstrous, but rather it is the fact that they are forced to perform it and are not free to leave. According to Block's argument, forcing a slave to perform pleasant tasks would be no less monstrous because it equally violates the libertarian non-aggression principle. An Inside Higher Education piece noted that, in response to the story, seventeen faculty members at Block's university publicly called for him to be censured for his "recurring public attacks ... on the civil rights of all." The piece also reported that Reverend Kevin Wildes, the President of Block's university, took the "unusual step" of publicly critiquing his arguments as fallacious.

Pay gap for black people and women

In a lecture Block called "Injustices in the Politics and Economics of Social Justice" presented at the invitation of the Adam Smith Society of the Economics Department of Loyola College, Baltimore in November 2008, Block asserted that "blacks and women" were paid less than whites because they are "less productive".

In the lecture, Block defended his views on women by alleging that among younger and unmarried women, there is virtually no income disparity. When asked by an attendee to explain the difference in productivity between blacks and whites, he stated that as an economist he was not qualified to explain the disparity. Block offered two thoughts that might account for the disparity: first, what he called the "politically correct" explanation, or socioeconomic disparities and historical injustices towards blacks; second, a "political incorrect" explanation, or "lower black IQs".

James Gill wrote in the Times-Picayune that the lecture "ignited a furor", resulting in the president of the university, Reverend Brian F. Linnane, apologizing for what was taken as a "sexist and racist outburst", with Gill opining that, "ideas contrary to fashionable preconceptions are always likely to throw academia into a fit".

According to Inside Higher Ed:

Perhaps almost as notable as the president's direct response was the condemnation issued jointly by the college's economics department and the Adam Smith Society ... "It is important to note that the remark was offensive not just because it was racially insensitive, but because it was erroneous and indicated poor-quality scholarship. There is ample scholarly evidence that, after adjusting for productivity-related characteristics (e.g., years of schooling, work experience, union and industry status, etc.) a considerable wage gap remains."

Despite the criticism showing evidence questioning the veracity of his statements, Block said he "regards sensitivity as the enemy of intellectual inquiry and truth." In a December 2008 article, Block wrote that the lessons he had learned from the incident were regarding the need for tenure if one wants to speak out, the wisdom of Murray Rothbard's words that "it is totally irresponsible to have a loud and vociferous opinion on economic subjects" while remaining ignorant of economics, and the importance of Ludwig von Mises' motto: "Do not give in to evil, but proceed ever more boldly against it."

Sexual assault
Block asserts that sexual harassment "that takes place between secretary and her boss is not a coercive action." He argues that "if pinching and sexual molestation are outlawed in private places, this violates the rights of those who voluntarily wish to engage in such practice." Block argues that the proof of the "voluntary" nature of such an act in a private place is that "the person endangered" (the victim woman) "has no claim [right] whatsoever to the private place in question."

Highway privatization

Block believes that government management of roads and highways is not only inefficient but also deadly. He argues that "road socialism" causes the deaths of more than 35,000 people in the United States each year. And, although many people blame highway deaths on alcohol, unsafe vehicles, or speeding, Block lays the blame on the government officials who manage the highway system. "It may well be that speed and alcohol are deleterious to safe driving; but it is the road manager's task to ascertain that the proper standards are maintained with regard to these aspects of safety. If unsafe conditions prevail in a private, multistory parking lot, or in a shopping mall, or in the aisles of a department store, the entrepreneur in question is held accountable."

Punishment of government employees

Block has written two papers about punishment of those engaging in "statist, governmental or other gangster activity". Block argues that there should be "a presumption that all government employees are guilty of a crime against humanity," though he notes that this presumption can be rebutted in many cases, such as that of U.S. Congressman and Mises Institute Senior Fellow Ron Paul. Block examines issues like restitution of land taken through eminent domain and possible retribution against politicians, IRS employees, and others who cooperated in governmental activity. He describes rules by which libertarian "Nuremberg Trials" might operate.

Evictionism (in contrast to abortion)

According to Block's moral theory, the act of abortion must be conceptually separated into the acts of the eviction of the fetus from the womb, and the killing of the fetus. Building on the libertarian stand against trespass and murder, Block supports a right to the first act, but, except in certain circumstances, not the second act. Block believes the woman may legally abort if the fetus is not viable outside the womb, or the woman has announced to the world her abandonment of the right to custody of the fetus, and no one else has "homesteaded" that right by offering to care for the fetus.

He also has written on finding a compromise between those who believe stem cell research is murder and those who favor it. He applies a libertarian theory of private property rights to his premise that even fertilized eggs have human rights and that the relevant issues are competition between researchers and those who wish to adopt the eggs.

Homesteading

Blockian Proviso

Block argues that if property is "necessary" for others to use, to get to unowned property, they have a easement over it and compared it to a person who murders a child without feeding it. He cites the example of a person with donut shaped land who doesn't allow anyone to get to the middle of his land as incompatible with the logic of homesteading.

Stephan Kinsella, who disagreed with Block coined the theory "The Blockean Proviso" after The Lockean Proviso. It has since been called the "Blockian Proviso".

Negative homesteading

Block has theorized on whether a person acting in self-defense can harm a human shield or hostage used by an aggressor. Block holds this is legitimate because the human shield is the first victim of the aggressor and, as such, cannot be allowed to pass on their misery to the defending person, the intended second victim of the aggressor. Block calls this "negative homesteading theory".

Foreign policy

Block supports a non-interventionist foreign policy. On LewRockwell.com, he criticized Randy Barnett's Wall Street Journal editorial on presidential candidate Ron Paul and on foreign policy.

Animal rights 
Block believes that the libertarian non-aggression principle does not apply to animals and that the right of human owners to kill, torture, or otherwise abuse animals may be an unavoidable corollary of libertarian premises. He articulated this position in a 2017 debate on animal rights, maintaining that groups must be able to petition for rights and respect the rights of others in order to qualify for rights themselves.

Publications

As author 
 Defending the Undefendable (1976; translated into ten foreign languages.) 
 A Response to the Framework Document for Amending the Combines Investigation Act (1982)
 Focus on Economics and the Canadian Bishops (1983)
 Focus on Employment Equity: A Critique of the Abella Royal Commission on Equality in Employment (with Michael A. Walker; 1985)
 The U.S. Bishops and Their Critics: An Economic and Ethical Perspective (1986). . 
 Lexicon of Economic Thought (with Michael A. Walker; 1988) . 
 Economic Freedom of the World, 1975–1995 (with James Gwartney, Robert Lawson; 1996)
 Labor Economics from a Free Market Perspective: Employing the Unemployable (2008). . 
 The Privatization of Roads and Highways: Human and Economic Factors (2009). . 
 Differing Worldviews in Higher Education: Two Scholars Argue Cooperatively about Justice Education (2010) 
 Building Blocks for Liberty (2010). Ludwig von Mises Institute, . 
 
 Yes to Ron Paul and Liberty (2012). . 
 Defending the Undefendable II (2013). .
 Water Capitalism: The Case for Privatizing Oceans, Rivers, Lakes, and Aquifers (2016). .
 Space Capitalism: How Humans Will Colonize Planets, Moons, and Asteroids (2018). .

As editor 
 Zoning: Its Costs and Relevance for the 1980s (Ed.; 1980)
 Rent Control: Myths & Realities (Ed. with Edgar Olsen; 1981)
 Discrimination, Affirmative Action and Equal Opportunity (Ed. with Michael A. Walker; 1982)
 Taxation: An International Perspective (Ed. with Michael A. Walker; 1984)
 Economics and the Environment: A Reconciliation (Ed.; 1985; translated into Portuguese 1992) 
 Morality of the Market: Religious and Economic Perspectives (Ed. with Geoffrey Brennan, Kenneth Elzinga; 1985)
 Theology, Third World Development and Economic Justice (Ed. with Donald Shaw; 1985)
 Reaction: The New Combines Investigation Act (Ed.; 1986)
 Religion, Economics & Social Thought (Ed. with Irving Hexham; 1986)
 Man, Economy and Liberty: Essays in Honor of Murray N. Rothbard (Ed. with Lew Rockwell; 1988)
 Breaking the Shackles; the Economics of Deregulation: A Comparison of U.S. and Canadian Experience (Ed. with George Lermer; 1991)
 Economic Freedom: Toward a Theory of Measurement (Ed.; 1991)
 Libertarian Autobiographies (Ed.; forthcoming)

Notes

External links

 Walter Block faculty page, College of Business Administration, Loyola University New Orleans.
 WalterBlock.com
 
 Commentary by Walter Block for CNBC
 Biography and Article Archive at Mises.org.
 Media Archive at Mises.org.
 Defending the Undefendable
 Appearances on C-SPAN

1941 births
Living people
20th-century American economists
20th-century American male writers
20th-century American non-fiction writers
20th-century atheists
21st-century American economists
21st-century American male writers
21st-century American non-fiction writers
21st-century atheists
American anarcho-capitalists
Jewish American atheists
American book editors
American economics writers
American libertarians
American male non-fiction writers
American political writers
Austrian School economists
Brooklyn College alumni
Former Marxists
Columbia Graduate School of Arts and Sciences alumni
Economists from New York (state)
Environmental economists
James Madison High School (Brooklyn) alumni
Jewish American writers
Libertarian economists
Libertarian theorists
Mises Institute people
Non-interventionism
People from Brooklyn
Political philosophers
Urban theorists
Writers from Alabama
Writers from New York (state)